Kasamatsu may refer to:

 Kasamatsu, Gifu (笠松), a town in Hashima District, Gifu Prefecture, Japan
Kasamatsu Station (Gifu) (笠松駅), a railway station located in Kasamatsu, Hashima District, Gifu Prefecture, Japan
Nishi-Kasamatsu Station in Gifu
 Kasamatsu Stadium a multi-purpose stadium in Naka, Japan, built in 1998
 Kasamatsu (surname), a Japanese surname